Berghaus is a German language habitational surname meaning 'at the Berghaus' ("mountain house"). Notable people with the name include:
 Albert Berghaus (fl. 1869–1880), American illustrator 
 Alexander Berghaus (1952), German otolaryngologist
 Heinrich Berghaus (1797–1884), German geographer and cartographer
 Hermann Berghaus (1828–1890), German cartographer
 Ruth Berghaus (1927–1996), German choreographer, opera and theatre director, and artistic director

References 

German-language surnames
German toponymic surnames